The Mars-69/M-69 or 2M was the designation given to 2 Soviet Mars probes that were to be sent in 1969. Based on the Luna E-8 landers used for Luna 15-24 (including Lunokhod 1 and 2), they were the first attempted Mars and Interplanetary Orbiters. The probes however were both destroyed in separate launches in early 1969.

Development and Launches 
After the landing of Venera 4 in October 1967, NPO Lavochkin looked at landing a larger probe on Mars with an Orbiter. Using the newer Proton-K (Blok-D), they could beat NASA's upcoming Mariner 6 and 7 probes in the 1969 Mars launch window. By modifying the E-8 lander, the original M-69 design was created with a lander. The M-69 bus was however changed with a hard lander before finally in 1969, the lander was abandoned due to time constraints. 

The first launch occurred on March 27, 1969, when Mars-69A (2M No.521) was launched. Although the first two stages of the Proton-K worked, the third stage failed and the probe crashed in the Altai mountains.

The second and last launch on April 2, 1969 failed when the Proton-K Blok-D carrying it first had smoke appearing from the first stage before it veered west, crashing near Site 81/23.

Legacy 
After the failure of M-69, NPO Lavochkin redesigned Mars-69 to allow for a landing on Mars in 1971. This design would become the M-71, the first version of 4MV bus.

References 

Soviet Mars missions